Heaven's Floor is a 2016 Canadian/American drama film written and directed by Lori Stoll. The film stars Clea DuVall, Timothy V Murphy, Toby Huss, Katie May Dunford and Nicole Sullivan. Heaven's Floor had its world premiere at the 2016 Cinequest Film Festival on March 4, 2016.

Plot
Julia, a Los Angeles photographer, joins an expedition to the Canadian Arctic. She arrives ill-equipped and later finds herself stranded when she is rescued by an eleven year old Inuit girl, Malaya, and her uncle. They take Julia to a small Inuit community where she becomes attached to Malaya. Later in Los Angeles Julia learns of tragic events in the Arctic and returns to adopt Malaya. Once in Los Angeles the little girl struggles to find acceptance.

Cast

 Clea DuVall as Julia
 Timothy V Murphy as Jack
 Toby Huss as Ed
 Katie May Dunford as Malaya
 Nicole Sullivan as Karen

Awards
 Heaven's Floor won the Grand Jury Award at the 2016 Alaska International Film Awards 
 Katie May Dunford won Best Actress at the 2016 El Dorado Film Festival.

References

External links
 

2016 films
American drama films
Canadian drama films
English-language Canadian films
Films scored by J. Peter Robinson
2016 drama films
Inuktitut-language films
2010s American films
2010s Canadian films